Savage Mutiny is a 1953 Jungle Jim film starring Johnny Weissmuller. It was the tenth entry in the series.

Plot

Cast

References

External links
Savage Mutiny at IMDb
Savage Mutiny at TCMDB
Review of film at Variety

1953 films
Jungle Jim films
Columbia Pictures films
American adventure films
1953 adventure films
American black-and-white films
1950s English-language films
Films directed by Spencer Gordon Bennet
1950s American films

Cast:
Angela Stevens
Lester Matthews
Nelson Leigh
Charles Stevens
Paul Marion
Gregory Gay
Leonard Penn
Ted Thorpe
Tamba

Screen Play by
Sol Shor